Fred Williams (born February 8, 1957) is an American basketball coach who is currently the associate head coach for the Auburn Tigers women's basketball team.

Career

Williams served as an assistant coach at the University of Southern California from 1983 to 1990 and as head coach from 1995 to 1997. Williams coached the Utah Starzz (now the San Antonio Stars) of the WNBA from 1999 to 2001 and later served as an assistant coach with the Charlotte Sting. Williams coached the San Diego Siege of the NWBL, before joining the Atlanta Dream as an assistant coach in 2009.

Williams took over as head coach and general manager of the Atlanta Dream of the WNBA on August 27, 2012, when the team fired Marynell Meadors. The Dream lost their first game under Williams, falling to the Tulsa Shock 84–80. However, the team rebounded, winning six of their next seven, and qualified for the playoffs.

In his first full season as head coach, the Dream got out to a 10–1 record, which at the time was the best in the league. However, forward Sancho Lyttle went out with a fractured foot, and the Dream struggled to finish the season, ending with a 17–17 record. Nevertheless, the Dream got hot in the playoffs and earned their third trip to the WNBA Finals in four seasons, losing in three games to the Minnesota Lynx.

Despite guiding his team to an Eastern Conference championship, it was announced at the end of the season that Williams' contract would not be renewed. On January 23, 2014, the Shock announced his hiring as their third head coach since the franchise moved to Tulsa, replacing Gary Kloppenburg.

Coaching record

|-
| align="left" | UTA
| align="left" |1999
|28||13||15||.463|| align="center" |6th in West||—||—||—||—
| align="center" |Missed Playoffs
|-
| align="left" |UTA
| align="left" |2000
|32||18||14||.563|| align="center" |5th in West||—||—||—||—
| align="center" |Missed Playoffs
|-
| align="left" |UTA
| align="left" |2001
| 13|| 5|| 8||.384|| align="center" |3rd in West ||—||—||—||—
| align="center" |Left Before Playoffs
|-
| align="left" |ATL
| align="left" |2012
| 10|| 7|| 3||.700|| align="center" |3rd in East ||3||1||2||.333
| align="center" |Lost in Eastern Conference Semi-Finals
|-
| align="left" |ATL
| align="left" |2013
| 34|| 17|| 17||.500|| align="center" |2nd in East ||8||4||4||.500
| align="center" |Lost in WNBA Finals
|-
| align="left" |TUL
| align="left" |2014
| 34|| 12|| 22||.353|| align="center" |5th in West ||—||—||—||—
| align="center" |Missed Playoffs
|-
| align="left" |TUL
| align="left" |2015
| 34|| 18|| 16|| .529|| align="center" |  3rd in West||2||0||2||.000
| align="center" | Lost in Western Conference Semi-Finals
|-
| align="left" |DAL
| align="left" |2016
| 34|| 11|| 23|| || align="center" |  5th in West||-||-||-||-
| align="center" | Missed Playoffs
|-
| align="left" |DAL
| align="left" |2017
| 34|| 16|| 18|| || align="center" |  4th in West||1||0||1||.000
| align="center" | Lost in 1st Round
|-
| align="left" |DAL
| align="left" |2018
| 31|| 14|| 17|| || align="center" | 5th in West||–||–||–||–
| align="center" | Missed Playoffs
|-
| align="left" |LAS
| align="left" |2022
| 24|| 8|| 16|| || align="center" | 12th in West||–||–||–||–
| align="center" | Missed Playoffs
|-class="sortbottom"
| align="left" |Career
| ||308||139||169|||| ||14||5||9||||

References

External links
"Shock Name Fred Williams Head Coach" at Tulsa Shock official website

1957 births
Living people
American men's basketball players
American women's basketball coaches
Atlanta Dream coaches
Boise State Broncos men's basketball players
Charlotte Sting coaches
Dallas Wings head coaches
Los Angeles Sparks head coaches
Tulsa Shock head coaches
USC Trojans women's basketball coaches
Utah Starzz coaches
Women's National Basketball Association executives
Women's National Basketball Association general managers